Jurij Repe (born September 17, 1994) is a Slovenian professional ice hockey player. He is currently a free agent.

Repe made his Czech Extraliga debut playing with HC Oceláři Třinec during the 2014-15 Czech Extraliga season. He also played in the 1st Czech Republic Hockey League for AZ Havířov and HC Kladno as well as in the Metal Ligaen in Denmark for the Herning Blue Fox.

Repe played for the Slovenia national team at the 2018 Winter Olympics.

Career statistics

Regular season and playoffs

International

References

External links

1994 births
Living people
AZ Havířov players
Herning Blue Fox players
Rytíři Kladno players
HC Košice players
HC Oceláři Třinec players
Saint John Sea Dogs players
Slovenian ice hockey defencemen
Sportspeople from Kranj
Ice hockey players at the 2018 Winter Olympics
Olympic ice hockey players of Slovenia
HK Poprad players
Slovenian expatriate sportspeople in the Czech Republic
Slovenian expatriate sportspeople in Slovakia
Slovenian expatriate sportspeople in Canada
Slovenian expatriate sportspeople in Denmark
Slovenian expatriate ice hockey people
Expatriate ice hockey players in the Czech Republic
Expatriate ice hockey players in Slovakia
Expatriate ice hockey players in Canada
Expatriate ice hockey players in Denmark